Howard Schnellenberger Field at FAU Stadium is a college football stadium located at the north end of the main campus of Florida Atlantic University (FAU) in Boca Raton, Florida. Opened in 2011, it is home to the Florida Atlantic Owls football team and is intended to be the first part of FAU's multi-use development project, "Innovation Village" as a replacement for Lockhart Stadium

After selecting an architect in 2008, the university began to raise funds for the $70 million facility with the intent to begin construction in 2009. The $70 million stadium was funded through student fees, private donations, and naming rights partnerships, some of which have yet to be determined. After fundraising efforts slowed, the school delayed construction until 2010. The stadium opened when the 2011 Florida Atlantic Owls football team lost to the Western Kentucky Hilltoppers on October 15, 2011.

Starting in 2014, FAU Stadium became home to the Boca Raton Bowl, a college football bowl game which features teams from the Mid-American Conference and in alternating years Conference USA and the American Athletic Conference.

Also starting in 2014, FAU Stadium was home to the Major League Lacrosse's Florida Launch until 2018.

The playing surface was named Howard Schnellenberger Field, after the founding coach of the Owls football program, on August 20, 2014. Schnellenberger spent the final 11 seasons of his coaching career at FAU, retiring after the 2011 season.

History

Early planning and finance
Although initial plans for a new stadium hinted at the possibility of a 40,000-seat domed facility, later plans called for a 30,000-seat open air stadium. The steel stadium would allow for future expansion up to 65,000 seats as well as a roof if needed. The architect for the stadium was finalized in July 2008 when the firms of HKS and Schenkel Shultz were awarded the contract, finishing ahead of Ellerbe Becket and HOK.
The new football stadium was projected to cost $70 million. To fund the stadium's construction, FAU secured a $12 million development rights deal with Crocker Partners LLC. In return, Crocker Partners secured the right to develop up to 2,400 new apartment-style beds on the Boca Raton campus; the first phase of 1,200 beds opened the fall 2011. On July 21, 2010, FAU trustees approved $44.6 million finance plan from Regions Bank.
FAU Stadium is one of the only collegiate football stadiums in the United States with a 180 degree view of the ocean from its highest seating positions.

Construction
The school initially expected to break ground in spring 2009 and play its inaugural home game in fall 2010 against the Michigan State Spartans; however, fundraising efforts fell short, and the stadium opening was delayed until fall 2011. Construction managers James A. Cummings, Inc. (a Tutor Perini Company) and Balfour Beatty Construction broke ground in the fall of 2010. Dant Clayton Corporation handled fabrication and installation of the stadium.

Opening season

The venue opened for the Owls' first home game on October 15, 2011, when the team lost to the Western Kentucky Hilltoppers, 20–0. The announced attendance for the game was 29,103, although attendance dropped to 16,344 for team's second home game against the Middle Tennessee Blue Raiders. The Owls finished the season with a 1–11 record, its sole win coming against the UAB Blazers on November 26 in front of a home crowd of 12,044. The team's average home attendance for the year in its new stadium was 17,565, ranking it 103rd among Football Bowl Subdivision (FBS) teams.

Naming rights
Although the project had acquired approximately $3.69 million through naming rights by June 2011, the school had yet to sell the naming rights to stadium itself by the end of the team's first season in the facility. Originally, FAU aimed for a $1 million-per-year deal, but had dropped that expectation to around $400,000 by the team's first home game of the 2011 season. During halftime at that game, FAU athletic director Craig Angelos stated that the school was "very close" to making a deal.

On February 19, 2013, the school announced that the naming rights to the stadium had been secured for approximately $6 million by the GEO Group, a private prison investor and operator. The $6 million would have been paid over 12 years. The company's chief executive officer, George Zoley, is an alumnus of the school and member of the FAU Board of Trustees. In reaction to the deal, FAU play-by-play announcer Ken LaVicka dubbed the stadium "Owlcatraz". After public pressure from a handful of protests and significant bad publicity, Zoley and FAU president Mary Jane Saunders canceled the naming rights deal.

Notable events

Soccer

Structure and facilities

The stadium is the first phase of the university's Innovation Village, a multipurpose project which will include four apartment-style residence halls,  of retail shopping space, and a multi-use convocation center for the basketball program modeled after Knights Plaza at the University of Central Florida. The field uses natural turf (Bermuda grass "Celebration"), and while FAU has been in Conference USA for a few seasons now, it was the only home field in the Sun Belt Conference without artificial turf. The stadium is one of a number of stadiums in Florida which use the same cultivar.

The skybox and press box overlook the Atlantic Ocean; FAU claims that no other football stadium in the United States offers a view of the open ocean.

Attendance Records

See also
 List of NCAA Division I FBS football stadiums

References

External links
 

College football venues
Florida Atlantic Owls football
Sports venues in Boca Raton, Florida
2011 establishments in Florida
American football venues in Florida
Lacrosse venues in the United States
Former Major League Lacrosse venues
Sports venues completed in 2011